Tomasz Maciej Markowski (born 30 May 1968 in Warsaw) is a Polish politician. He was elected to the Sejm on 25 September 2005, getting 17,097 votes in 4 Bydgoszcz district as a candidate from the Law and Justice list.

He was also a member of Sejm 2001-2005.

He is accused of embezzlement of 138,000 PLN from the parliament office.

See also
Members of Polish Sejm 2005-2007

References

External links
Tomasz Markowski - parliamentary page - includes declarations of interest, voting record, and transcripts of speeches.

1968 births
Living people
Politicians from Warsaw
Members of the Polish Sejm 2005–2007
Members of the Polish Sejm 2001–2005
Law and Justice politicians
Movement for Reconstruction of Poland politicians